Justin Boston (born September 12, 1989) is an American former professional stock car racing driver. A former development driver for Joe Gibbs Racing, he most recently drove the No. 54 Toyota Tundra for Kyle Busch Motorsports in the NASCAR Camping World Truck Series. Boston was the Rookie of the Year in the ARCA Racing Series driving for Venturini Motorsports in 2013.

Early and personal life
Born to parents Robert M. "Bob" and Caron, Boston is one of the few professional race car drivers from the state of Maryland. He is a native of Sparks and Towson, both suburbs of Baltimore.  Boston's racing interests were sparked with a dirt bike birthday present at age five, and he would begin his career running motocross in the late 1990s. Boston would practice at the Maryland State Fairgrounds, but would often travel 8–14 hours to get to races in other states. By age 13, he had collected over 300 wins across the country. Boston quit motocross after an incident in which his bike hit him in the head, breaking his helmet and lacerating his face. He began his transition to stock car racing at age 16 after attending a race at Dover International Speedway, and proceeded to enroll at the Buck Baker Racing School in Charlotte, outclassing his fellow students. Boston began his stock car career in Legends Cars, then ran six races in the USAR Pro Cup Series in 2009, with four top 10 finishes. Supported by Turner Scott Motorsports, he proceeded to run in the  UARA-STARS late-model series, making the commute from Maryland to Charlotte every weekend. Shortly after enrolling in Washington College, Boston made a full commitment to his racing career, moving to Charlotte. His support, however dried up and he spent 2010 and 2011 out of the sport.

Boston attended high school at the Boys' Latin School of Maryland. Boston's father Bob is the co-founder of Zloop Electronic Recycling, which had sponsored his race efforts from 2013 to 2015. In 2015, the company filed for Chapter 11 bankruptcy. Bob was later convicted of fraud surrounding the company and was sentenced to a 10-year prison sentence in 2018.

ARCA and NASCAR career

2013

In July 2012, Boston signed with Venturini Motorsports to drive the full ARCA Racing Series season in 2013. Coming onto sponsor the team was electronic recycling company Zloop, founded in 2012 and based in Hickory, North Carolina. At the age of 23 years, Boston was one of the older rookies to enter ARCA competition, but was second quickest in December testing at Daytona out of 61 drivers, timing in at 48.871 seconds (184.158 mph). Boston ran the full 21-race schedule, scoring poles at both races at Salem Speedway to go along with 18 total top 10 qualifying efforts. Despite not winning a race, he finished the year with eight top 5s and an impressive 16 top 10s to earn 3rd place in the championship standings behind 10-time champion Frank Kimmel and Mason Mingus. Boston was selected as the 2013 SCOTT rookie of the year.

2014
Boston and ZLOOP resigned with Venturini Motorsports for 2014. Boston scored poles in the first two races of the season, including his third consecutive pole at Salem Speedway. He scored his first victory at the MENARDS 200 at Toledo Speedway in May, after taking the lead from Grant Enfinger with 20 laps to go. It was the first victory at the 0.5 mile track for Venturini since Bill Venturini won in 1987. Boston took his second win of the season at Madison International Speedway in August, after taking the lead on a late race pit stop.

It was announced in August that Boston, Zloop, and Venturini would move up to the Camping World Truck Series starting at Bristol Motor Speedway. Team owner Billy Venturini himself would serve as Boston's crew chief. Boston qualified 27th and finished 30th after a crash. The team planned to run the final three races of the season in preparation for a full-time effort in 2015, but those plans were scrapped when sponsor Zloop shifted their focus to the next season.

In September, it was announced that Boston would make his Nationwide Series debut at Kentucky Speedway for Joe Gibbs Racing in their No. 20 Toyota Camry. Boston also ran the car the following weekend at Dover International Speedway, where his stock car interests originally began. Boston finished 9th in his debut at Kentucky, and followed it up with a 12th at Dover.

2015
In November 2014, it was announced that Boston and Zloop had signed with Kyle Busch Motorsports to run the full 2015 Camping World Truck Series season in the 54 Toyota Tundra in a two-year contract, replacing Darrell Wallace Jr. Shannon Rursch was named crew chief for the effort. After nine races and while sitting 12th in the points standings, Boston and KBM parted ways, replaced by Christopher Bell and other drivers. Initial reports stated that Boston and KBM parted ways due to lack of performance and requests for internal changes by Boston not being met. Later reports, however, stated that KBM released Boston due to sponsor Zloop breaching its agreement with the team.  The company had initially signed on to be the primary sponsor, but only appeared in two races. It was revealed in August that Zloop failed to make payments to KBM, leading the team to sue the company and Boston for $4.025 million. In 2016, bankruptcy proceedings revealed that Zloop and Boston's father spent more money on Boston's racing career than any other expenditure for the company.

Motorsports career results

NASCAR
(key) (Bold – Pole position awarded by qualifying time. Italics – Pole position earned by points standings or practice time. * – Most laps led.)

Nationwide Series

Camping World Truck Series

K&N Pro Series East

ARCA Racing Series
(key) (Bold – Pole position awarded by qualifying time. Italics – Pole position earned by points standings or practice time. * – Most laps led.)

 Season still in progress 
 Ineligible for series points

References

External links
 

Living people
NASCAR drivers
ARCA Menards Series drivers
1989 births
Sportspeople from Baltimore County, Maryland
Racing drivers from Baltimore
Racing drivers from Maryland
People from Towson, Maryland
Kyle Busch Motorsports drivers
Joe Gibbs Racing drivers
NASCAR controversies